Restani is a surname. Notable people with the surname include: 

Jane A. Restani (born 1948), American judge
Joseph Restani (born 1997), American soccer player
Kevin Restani (1951–2010), American basketball player
Paolo Restani (born 1967), Italian classical pianist